Yıldırım Demirören  (born 6 October 1964) is a Turkish businessman, former chair of the Istanbul-based Turkish multisports club Beşiktaş, and former president of the Turkish Football Federation.

He owns part of Demirören Şirketler Grubu (Demirören Group), which was founded in 1964 and are focused on liquid gas distribution.

Yıldırım Demirören resigned from his post as the president of Beşiktaş J.K. to be a candidate for the presidency of the Turkish Football Federation (TFF). He was elected president of the TFF on 27 February 2012 succeeding Mehmet Ali Aydınlar, who resigned on 31 January 2012.

Personal life 
Demirören is an alumnus of Leysin American School. He is married and has three children. He is also member of Turkish business associations TÜSİAD and TUGİAD. His hobbies are golf and traveling.

References 

1964 births
Living people
Turkish businesspeople
Turkish newspaper publishers (people)
Beşiktaş J.K. presidents
Turkish Football Federation presidents
Turkish sports executives and administrators